The 1970 Greyhound Derby took place during June with the final being held on 27 June 1970 at White City Stadium.  
The winner was John Silver and the winning owner received £9,861. John Silver was owned, bred and reared by Reg Young, who later went on to take out a trainer's licence in his own right. 
1981

Final result 
At White City (over 525 yards):

Distances 
1, 5, 1¼, 1¾, 2½ (lengths)
The distances between the greyhounds are in finishing order and shown in lengths. One length is equal to 0.08 of one second.

Competition Report
The 1970 derby attracted 187 entries and the market leaders were Cals Pick the 1969 Greyhound of the Year, Trafalgar Cup winner Sherwood Glen, Moordyke Spot, Valiant Ray the Select Stakes champion and Hack It Lee. In addition trainer Geoff DeMulder had a greyhound called Little County that was subject to significant ante-post wagers.

The qualifying races were a series of races with no betting to determine which greyhounds would line up as the final 48. On the Monday before the competition got underway 125 hounds took part and Cals Pick, Valiant Ray and Sherwood Glen all failed to progress through. John Silver was the fastest qualifier in 28.94 sec and subsequently became one of the favourites alongside Moordyke Spot.

During the first round Moordyke Spot went quickest in 28.74 with John Silver and Little County also winning. The second round pitted Moordyke Spot with John Silver and the latter came out on top in 28.56; Little County remained unbeaten which attracted a £5,000 bet by B.J. Patel to win the event.

The semi-finals arrived and DeMulder's Little County won again going into the final unbeaten whilst Moordyke Sport gained quick revenge over John Silver in the second heat. On the run up to final night Little County was backed once again in London bookmakers shops and the bookies now had £25,000 liabilities against the greyhound.

The bookmakers made Little County 7-4 favourite for the final but he missed the break as the lids went up. Recovering well he showed good early pace to get into contention by the second bend and then led by the third bend but John Silver, who was involved in early bunching was always in contention before passing Little County to claim a one length victory. The success enabled Barbara Tompkins to claim responsibility for a Derby winner one year after her involvement with Sand Star. John Silver, a British-bred son of 1966 winner Faithful Hope was bred and owned by Reg Young, who later became a promoter at the Milton Keynes track.

Quarter finals

Semi finals

See also
1970 UK & Ireland Greyhound Racing Year

References

Greyhound Derby
English Greyhound Derby
English Greyhound Derby
English Greyhound Derby